George Alburtus Anderson (March 11, 1853 – January 31, 1896) was a U.S. Representative from Illinois.

Born in Botetourt County, Virginia, Anderson moved to Illinois in 1855 with his parents, who settled in Hancock County.
He attended the common schools.
He was graduated from Carthage (Illinois) College in 1876.
He studied law in Lincoln, Nebraska, and Sedalia, Missouri.
He was admitted to the bar in 1878 and commenced practice in Quincy, Illinois, in 1880.
He was an unsuccessful candidate for city attorney of Quincy in 1883.

Anderson was elected city attorney in 1884 and again in 1885.

Anderson was elected as a Democrat to the Fiftieth Congress (March 4, 1887 – March 3, 1889).
He declined to be a candidate for renomination in 1888.
He engaged in the practice of law until his death in Quincy, Illinois, January 31, 1896.
He was interred in Woodlawn Cemetery.

References

1853 births
1896 deaths
Democratic Party members of the United States House of Representatives from Illinois
19th-century American politicians